Macquarie Telecom Group Limited (ASX: MAQ) is an Australian cloud, data centre, government cyber security and telecom company, with offices in Sydney, Melbourne, Canberra, Brisbane and Perth. It owns and operates five data centers in Sydney and Canberra.

Macquarie Telecom was founded in July 1992 shortly after telecommunications deregulation in Australia. The company was listed on the Australian Securities Exchange (ASX) in 1999.

Macquarie Telecom Group - the business units
On 28 July 2016, Macquarie Telecom Group was announced with three distinct businesses – Macquarie Telecom, Macquarie Cloud Services and Macquarie Government. In 2018, it announced a fourth business unit, Macquarie Data Centres.

 Macquarie Telecom is a full service business provider of data, voice, mobile and colocation services.
 Macquarie Cloud Services provide cloud hosting services, including hybrid cloud, VMware cloud, virtual data centres, private cloud, dedicated servers, dedicated hosting, object storage and PCI compliant cloud
 Macquarie Government provides services to Federal and State Government agencies, including secure cloud, secure internet gateway, colocation and cybersecurity services
 Macquarie Data Centres manages five data centres and an expansion plan to build Intellicentre 3 Super West was announced in 2021.

Data Centre and Hosting

Macquarie Telecom Group runs five data centers as part of its business selling managed services and managed hosting. The data centres are located in Sydney and Canberra and are branded by Macquarie Telecom Group as "Intellicentre".  Its second Sydney Data Center, Intellicentre 2, was opened September 2012, and it has Intellicentre 4 and 5 in Canberra.

In August 2021, Macquarie Telecom Group's full portfolio of data centres achieved The Australian Federal Government's Certified Strategic designation under the Digital Transformation Agency's (DTA) Hosting Certification Framework.

Announcements
 In August 2017, Macquarie Telecom started a SD-WAN service, partnering with VMware. According to the company, it is Australia's first SD-WAN service that is capable of supporting multiple carriers.
 In June 2018, Macquarie Telecom Group signed deal with NBN Co worth more than 100 million. As part of the deal, Macquarie Telecom will start "Business-class NBN by Macquarie Telecom" which consists of a full suite of voice, internet, data and SD-WAN products that will be available to businesses across the country for new and existing customers
 In August 2019, Macquarie Telecom Group announced signing of a deal with Apple Inc through which Macquarie Telecom Group will resell Apple devices along with "bespoke” and off-the-shelf iOS apps for mid-market businesses.
In November 2019, The Australian Tax Office signs Macquarie Telecom Group for Secure Internet Gateway
In October 2020, Macquarie Telecom Group was awarded World's Best Customer Experience at the World Communications Awards, CEO David Tudehope was also awarded CEO of the Year
In November 2020, at the annual GloTel (Global Telecoms) awards, Macquarie Cloud Services won Managed Services Innovation of the Year for Azure Managed
In February 2021, Macquarie Telecom debuted it's SD-LAN service
In July 2021, Macquarie Telecom Group announced plans to build a new data centre called Intellicentre 3 Super West at its Macquarie Park Data Centre Campus

Clients
Some clients and partners of Macquarie Telecom Group include: Dell, Cisco, VMware, Fortinet, Red Hat, Zerto, Virtustream, Google, Accenture, Marketo, News Corp, Westpac, BMC, Symantec, Vision Australia, Hall and Prior, Parliament of Australia, Federal Court of Australia, Western Sydney Airport, Department of the Prime Minister and Cabinet, Victoria State Government, Tourism Australia, Civil Aviation Safety Authority, Australian Prudential Regulation Authority,

References

Telecommunications companies of Australia
Companies listed on the Australian Securities Exchange
Companies based in Sydney
Telecommunications companies established in 1992